Maciej Trapola (?-1637) was an Italian architect who worked as the court architect under Stanislaw Lubomirski in Poland during the Baroque era.

Biography 
Maciej Trapola was an Italian architect working primarily in Poland in the early 17th century. Trapola's architectural style was Baroque with characteristics of Mannerism. Most, if not all of Trapola's structures were built in the Polish town of Nowy Wisnicz for then owner Stanislaw Lubomirski. Lubomirski was a Polish general who had inherited ownership of the town from his father. During the time of Lubomirskis ownership he ordered Trapola to build several structures as well as fortifications for existing structures. Trapola is also credited with the urban planning of Nowy Wisnicz into its current grid layout. The main focal points of the grid layout are the Town Square and Town Hall.

Legacy 
Some of Trapola's work can still be seen in the small Polish region of Nowy Wisnicz. The Nowy Wisnicz castle continues to sit proudly atop the hill overlooking the small town and featured the fortifications that were added by Trapola around 1615-1621. Another example of Trapola's work in Nowy Wisnicz is the Assumption of the Blessed Virgin Mary Catholic Church. This church is still actively used to this day.

Home & studio 
Maciej Trapola's home, from 1622–1637, can still be visited today in the center of Nowy Wisnicz, Poland. The building underwent extensive renovations in 1998, and a plaque was added to the outside of the building commemorating the Architect. The plaque was added by Professor Czesław Dźwigaj, and it reads "In this house from 1622 to death in 1637 lived and created Maciej Trapola an outstanding Italian architect, builder of the castle, parish church, town hall and Carmelite monastery, author of the first measurements and urban-spatial assumptions of the city of Nowy Wiśnicz."

Works 

 Castle of Nowy Wisnicz
 Assumption of the Blessed Virgin Mary Catholic Church
 Discalced Carmelite Monastery (destroyed 1939)
Ruins located south of the Castle if Nowy Wisnicz
 Town Hall in Nowy Wisnicz (1616–1620)
Parish Church in Nowy Wisnicz (1616–1621)

Gallery

References 

1637 deaths
Italian Baroque architects
Year of birth unknown
Date of death unknown